Pimpalgaon Baswant is a village in Nashik district, Maharashtra, India. It lies 30 km north of Nashik on the NH3. With the new national highway numbering, it lies on NH60. It is well connected with a six lane motorway with Nashik. Its geographical coordinates are 20° 10' 0" North, 73° 59' 0" East. It is situated on the banks of a small river Parashari. It derives its name Baswant from the local deity Baswanteshwar located inside the old town, this also helps to distinguish this town from other towns having the same first name.

Pimpalgaon Baswant, like most other towns in this region of Nashik District is famous for its agricultural produce and has an agrarian economy. It is very famous for its variety of grapes, tomatoes, sugar cane, onions and raisins it produces and exports. Gram Panchayat (local civic administration) prides itself as one of the richest of its kind in Asia. Farmers of Pimpalgaon Baswant are famous for experimental farming of grapes adopting new methods and improving technology.

Schools: Pimpalgaon High School (since 1942), Kanya-vidyalay, Bhimashanker.

Pincode: 422209 
Taluka: Niphad
District: Nashik
State: Maharashtra
Country: India

Nearest Airport - Nashik Airport (Ozar) - 15 km
Shirdi Airport - 68 km
Mumbai International Airport - 197 km

Nearest Railway stations -
Niphad - 12 km.
Nashik Road - 29 km
Manmad Junction - 49 km

References 

Cities and towns in Nashik district